Mabella (minor planet designation: 510 Mabella) is a minor planet orbiting the Sun.

References

External links
 
 

Background asteroids
Mabella
Mabella
PD-type asteroids (Tholen)
19030520